The 2014–15 Women's FIH Hockey World League Semifinals took place in June and July 2015. A total of 20 teams competed in 2 events in this round of the tournament playing for 7 berths in the Final, played between 21–29 November 2015 in Rosario, Argentina.

This round also served as a qualifier for the 2016 Summer Olympics as the 7 highest placed teams apart from the five continental champions qualified.

Qualification
11 teams ranked between 1st and 11th in the FIH World Rankings current at the time of seeking entries for the competition qualified automatically, in addition to 7 teams qualified from Round 2 and two nations that did not meet ranking criteria and were exempt from Round 2 to host a Semifinal. The following twenty teams, shown with final pre-tournament rankings, competed in this round of the tournament.

Valencia

All times are Central European Summer Time (UTC+02:00)

Umpires
Below are the 10 umpires appointed by the International Hockey Federation:

Amy Baxter (USA)
Karen Bennett (NZL)
Caroline Brunekreef (NED)
Elena Eskina (RUS)
Kelly Hudson (NZL)
Mariana Reydo (ARG)
Hannah Sanders (GBR)
Kylie Seymour (AUS)
Chieko Soma (JPN)
Emi Yamada (JPN)

First round

Pool A

Pool B

Second round

Quarter-finals

Ninth and tenth place

Fifth to eighth place classification

Crossover

Seventh and eighth place

Fifth and sixth place

First to fourth place classification

Semifinals

Third and fourth place

Final

Awards

Antwerp

All times are Central European Summer Time (UTC+02:00)

Umpires
Below are the 10 umpires appointed by the International Hockey Federation:

Claire Adenot (FRA)
Chen Hong (CHN)
Amber Church (NZL)
Carolina de la Fuente (ARG)
Laurine Delforge (BEL)
Kang Hyun-young (KOR)
Irene Presenqui (ARG)
Annelize Rostron (RSA)
Melissa Trivic (AUS)
Sarah Wilson (GBR)

First round

Pool A
Azerbaijan was supposed to take part but France took their place.

Pool B

Second round

Quarter-finals

Ninth and tenth place

Fifth to eighth place classification

Crossover

Seventh and eighth place

Fifth and sixth place

First to fourth place classification

Semifinals

Third and fourth place

Final

Awards

Final rankings
Qualification for 2016 Summer Olympics

 Continental champions
 Qualified through 2014–15 FIH Hockey World League
 Withdrew from participating

Goalscorers

References

External links
Official website (Valencia)
Official website (Antwerp)

Semifinals
International women's field hockey competitions hosted by Belgium
International women's field hockey competitions hosted by Spain
FIH Hockey World League Semifinals
FIH Hockey World League Semifinals
FIH Hockey World League Semifinals
Field hockey at the Summer Olympics – Women's qualification tournaments